The canton of Turriers is a former administrative division in southeastern France. It was disbanded following the French canton reorganisation which came into effect in March 2015. It consisted of 7 communes, which joined the canton of Seyne in 2015. It had 1,265 inhabitants (2012).

The canton comprised the following communes:
Bayons
Bellaffaire
Faucon-du-Caire
Gigors
Piégut
Turriers
Venterol

Demographics

See also
Cantons of the Alpes-de-Haute-Provence department

References

Former cantons of Alpes-de-Haute-Provence
2015 disestablishments in France
States and territories disestablished in 2015